Jean-Michel Frédéric Macron (born 1950) is a French doctor and professor of neurology at the University of Picardy. He is the father of French president Emmanuel Macron.

Early life
Jean-Michel Macron was born in 1950. His father was André Macron (1920–2010), a railway executive, and his mother was Jacqueline Macron (1922–1998), née Robertson, of half English origin. He wrote a thesis on feline neurology in 1981.

Career

Macron is a professor of neurology at the University of Picardy, specializing in sleep disorders and epilepsy.

Macron has published in academic journals such as  Neuroscience Letters, Brain Research, NeuroReport and Neurosurgery on sneezing in cats. Macron has 28 publications as author or co-author in the PubMed database.

Personal life
Jean-Michel Macron was first married to Françoise Noguès, a physician based in Amiens. She is the daughter of Jean Noguès and his wife Germaine Noguès (née Arribet, died 2013), both teachers. The first child of Jean-Michel and Françoise Macron died as an infant. They then had three children: Emmanuel (born 1977, the current President of France and husband of Brigitte Macron, née Trogneux), Laurent (born 1979, a radiologist and husband of Sabine Aimot, an obstetrician gynecologist), and Estelle (born 1982, a nephrologist and wife of Carl Franjou, an engineer). 

After the divorce of Jean-Michel and Françoise Macron, Jean-Michel Macron married Hélène Joly, a psychiatrist at the Centre Hospitalier Philippe Pinel in Dury, Somme.

References

1950 births
Living people
People from Amiens
French neurologists
Academic staff of the University of Picardy Jules Verne
Jean-Michel
French people of English descent
Parents of presidents of France